Guilherme António de Souza, known as Alemão (born 7 December 1992) is a Brazilian football player who plays for Ararat-Armenia.

Club career
Alemão made his professional debut in the Segunda Liga for Marítimo B on 31 August 2013 in a game against Feirense.

Alemão made his Primeira Liga debut for Marítimo on 4 May 2014 as a late substitute in a 1–1 draw against Braga.

On 23 July 2020, Ararat-Armenia announced the signing of Alemão.

Career statistics

Club

References

External links

1992 births
Living people
Footballers from São Paulo (state)
Brazilian footballers
G.D. Tourizense players
Brazilian expatriate footballers
Expatriate footballers in Portugal
Liga Portugal 2 players
C.S. Marítimo players
Primeira Liga players
Leixões S.C. players
U.D. Oliveirense players
FC Ararat-Armenia players
Association football forwards